The World Fantasy Convention is an annual convention of professionals, collectors, and others interested in the field of fantasy. The World Fantasy Awards are presented at the event.  Other features include an art show, a dealer's room, and an autograph reception.

The convention was conceived and begun by T. E. D. Klein, Kirby McCauley and several others.

Previous conventions

See also
 World Fantasy Award

References

External links
World Fantasy Convention
World Fantasy Convention 2019

1975 establishments in the United States
Fantasy conventions
 Convention